The Williamsville Covered Bridge is a historic covered bridge, carrying Dover Road over the Rock River in Newfane, Vermont.  Probably built in the 1870s, this Town lattice truss bridge is probably the oldest covered bridge in Windham County, and is the only one surviving in the town of Newfane.  It was listed on the National Register of Historic Places in 1973.

Description and history
It carries Dover Road, the main road leading west from the village, across the Rock River, whose valley the road follows in this area. It is supported by two Town lattice trusses, and its exterior is clad in vertical board siding. Its original wooden roadway supports have been replaced by steel beams, and the roadbed is paved.

The bridge was built in the 1870s by an unknown builder, and is the last surviving historic covered bridge in the town.

See also
National Register of Historic Places listings in Windham County, Vermont
List of bridges on the National Register of Historic Places in Vermont
List of Vermont covered bridges

References

External links
 

Covered bridges on the National Register of Historic Places in Vermont
Bridges completed in 1870
Covered bridges in Windham County, Vermont
Buildings and structures in Newfane, Vermont
National Register of Historic Places in Windham County, Vermont
Road bridges on the National Register of Historic Places in Vermont
Wooden bridges in Vermont
Lattice truss bridges in the United States
1870 establishments in Vermont